The United Kingdom declaration of war upon Germany occurred on 4 August 1914. The declaration was a result of German refusal to remove troops from neutral Belgium. In 1839, the United Kingdom of Great Britain and Ireland, France, and Prussia (the largest predecessor of the German Empire) had signed the Treaty of London which guaranteed Belgium's sovereignty.

However, the actual reasoning had at least as much to do with the British fright that lack of their help leading to a possible defeat of France could lead to German hegemony in Western Europe, with Christopher Clark pointing out that the British cabinet decided on July 29, 1914, that being a signatory to the 1839 treaty guaranteeing Belgium's frontiers did not obligate it to oppose a German invasion of Belgium with military force. According to Isabel V. Hull:
Annika Mombauer correctly sums up the current historiography: "Few historians would still maintain that the 'rape of Belgium' was the real motive for Britain's declaration of war on Germany." Instead, the role of Belgian neutrality is variously interpreted as an excuse used to mobilise public opinion, to provide embarrassed radicals in the cabinet with the justification for abandoning the principal of pacifism and thus staying in office, or - in the more conspiratorial versions - as cover for naked imperial interests. 
Refer to British entry into World War I for further details.

At the time, the British government in London was responsible for the foreign affairs not only of the British colonies and protectorates but also of the five Dominions, so its declaration of war was made on behalf of the whole British Empire.

Order of events 
On 3 August 1914, Sir Edward Grey, the Foreign Secretary, announced to the House of Commons information he had received from the Belgian Legation in London. He said that Belgian officials had informed him that they had received a notice from Germany proposing to Belgium friendly neutrality, covering free passage on Belgian territory, and promising maintenance of independence of the kingdom and possessions at the conclusion of peace, and threatening, in case of refusal, to treat Belgium as an enemy. A time limit of twelve hours was fixed for the reply. Grey then informed the House Belgium had informed him they would enter into no agreement with Germany.

On 4 August 1914, H. H. Asquith, the Prime Minister, made the following statement in the House of Commons:

On 5 August 1914, Asquith told the House of Commons:

During the same meeting, the House of Commons voted to approve a credit of £100,000,000 (£ in ) for the war effort.

Winston Churchill later wrote:

On the morning of 5 August, Lewis Harcourt, Secretary of State for the Colonies, chaired a sub-committee of the Committee of Imperial Defence which recommended the Cabinet to send expeditions to capture most of the German overseas colonies: German East Africa, German South West Africa, Togoland, and Kamerun; and to invite Australia to seize German New Guinea and Yap and New Zealand to send an expedition to capture Samoa, and Nauru.

See also 

 Declarations of war by Great Britain and the United Kingdom
Declarations of war during World War I
United Kingdom declaration of war on Germany (1939)

References 

1914 in Germany
1914 in military history
1914 in the United Kingdom
August 1914 events
United Kingdom in World War I
Declarations of war during World War I
H. H. Asquith
Germany–United Kingdom military relations